Iago Ângelo Dias (born 6 April 1993), known as lago or Iago Dias is a Brazilian footballer who plays for Náutico as a forward.

Club career
Born in São João Nepomuceno, Minas Gerais, Iago Dias represented Palmeiras as a youth before moving to Atibaia in 2012. In 2014, he moved to Grêmio Barueri, and made his senior debut on 20 February of that year by coming on as a late substitute in a 0–1 Campeonato Paulista Série A2 away loss against Batatais.

On 21 December 2015 Iago Dias returned to his former club Atibaia. He was an undisputed starter for the club during the Campeonato Paulista Série A3 championship, scoring six goals in 22 matches as his side reached the latter stages of the tournament.

On 22 June 2016, Iago Dias signed a one-year loan deal with Série A side Coritiba, after impressing on a trial period. He made his debut in the tournament a day later, replacing Walisson Maia in a 1–1 home draw against Internacional.

Iago Dias scored his first professional goal on 21 August 2016, netting the winner in a 2–1 home win against Santos. Ten days later, he scored the game's only in a home success over Vitória, taking Coxa to the following round of the year's Copa Sudamericana.

On 19 December 2016, Coritiba bought 50% of Iago Dias' federative rights, and the player signed a contract until 2020.

References

External links

1993 births
Living people
Sportspeople from Minas Gerais
Brazilian footballers
Association football forwards
Campeonato Brasileiro Série A players
Campeonato Brasileiro Série D players
Grêmio Barueri Futebol players
Coritiba Foot Ball Club players